John Augustus Tolton (April 1, 1854 – July 9, 1897), baptized Augustine Tolton, was the first Catholic priest in the United States publicly known to be Black. (The Healy brothers, who preceded him, all passed for White.) 

Tolton was ordained in Rome in 1886. Assigned to the Diocese of Alton (now the Diocese of Springfield in Illinois), Tolton first ministered at his home parish in Quincy, Illinois before opposition from local White Catholics and Black protestants caused discord. Reassigned to Chicago, Tolton led the development and construction of St. Monica's Catholic Church as a Black "national parish," completed in 1893 at 36th and Dearborn Streets on Chicago's South Side. Soon after, he died of a heat stroke at the age of 43 in 1897.

Tolton's cause for canonization was opened in 2010, and he was declared Venerable by Pope Francis in June 2019.

Biography

Early life

Parents and birth 
Tolton's mother, Martha Jane Chisley, was the daughter of Augustus and Matilda (née Hurd) Chisley (d. 1836), and grew up as the slave of John Henry Manning in Meade County, Kentucky. Martha Jane Chisley was also a cradle Catholic who had grown up attending St. Theresa's Catholic Church in Rhodelia. After the death of their slave master in 1835, the Chisley children were forcibly separated from their parents and divided up among his different heirs. Martha Jane Chisley was inherited by her owner's granddaughter, Mrs. Stephen Elliott of Ralls County, Missouri.

Tolton was born in Ralls County, Missouri slavery to Peter Paul and Martha Jane (née Chisley) Tolton. He was baptized into the Catholic Church as Augustine Tolton at St. Peter's Catholic Church located in the small community of Rensselaer, located near Hannibal, Missouri. His master was Stephen Elliott. Savilla Elliott, his master's wife, stood as Tolton's godmother.

Freedom 
How the Tolton family gained their freedom remains a subject of debate. According to accounts that Tolton told friends and parishioners, his father escaped first and enlisted in a regiment of Colored Troops in the Union Army during the American Civil War. Tolton's mother later ran away as well with their children Samuel, Charley, Augustine, and Anne. With the assistance of sympathetic Union soldiers and police, they successfully crossed the Mississippi River, and into the Free State of Illinois. According to his descendants, though, Stephen Elliott freed all of his slaves at the outbreak of the American Civil War and allowed them to move North. Augustine's father died of dysentery before the war ended.

Education and seminary 
After arriving in Quincy, Illinois, Martha, Augustus, and Charley began working at the Herris Tobacco Company, where they made cigars. After Charley's death at a young age, Augustine met Peter McGirr, an Irish Catholic priest from Fintona, County Tyrone. The latter allowed him to attend St. Lawrence's parochial school during the winter months when the factory was closed. The priest's decision was controversial in the parish. Although abolitionists were active in the town, many of McGirr's parishioners objected to a Black student at their children's school. McGirr held fast and allowed Tolton to study there. 

Later, Tolton continued studies directly with some priests, at one point even returning to his native Missouri, then rid of slavery after the Civil War. Making little progress toward the priesthood, Tolton then returned to Quincy and gained admission into St. Francis Solanus College (now Quincy University)—run by the Franciscans, who had previously been the first to reject his application for seminary.

Despite McGirr's support, Tolton was rejected by every American seminary to which he applied. Impressed by his personal qualities, McGirr continued to help him and enabled Tolton to study in Rome. He graduated from college and thereafter attended the Pontifical Urbaniana University, where he became fluent in the Italian language as well as studying Ecclesiastical Latin and Koine Greek.

Priesthood

Tolton was ordained to the priesthood in Rome in 1886 at age 31. His first public Mass was inside St. Peter's Basilica on Easter Sunday, 1886. Expecting to serve in an African mission, he studied its regional cultures and languages. Instead, he was directed to return to the United States to serve the Black community. Tolton celebrated his first Mass in the United States at St. Benedict the Moor Catholic Church in New York City. 

His first Mass in Quincy was at St. Boniface. He attempted to organize a parish there, but over the years, met with resistance from both white Catholics (many of whom were ethnic Germans) and Protestant African American ministers, who did not want him trying to attract people to another denomination. He organized St. Joseph Catholic Church and school in Quincy but ran into opposition from the new dean of the parish, who wanted him to turn away white worshipers from his services.

After reassignment to Chicago, Tolton led a mission society, St. Augustine's, which met in the basement of St. Mary's Church. He led the development and administration of the Negro "national parish" of St. Monica's Catholic Church, built at 36th and Dearborn Streets on the South Side. The church nave seated 850 parishioners and was built with money from philanthropists Mrs. Anne O'Neill and Katharine Drexel.

St. Monica's Parish grew from 30 parishioners to 600 with the construction of the new church building. Tolton's success at ministering to Black Catholics quickly earned him national attention within the Catholic hierarchy. "Good Father Gus," as he was called by many, was known for his "eloquent sermons, his beautiful singing voice, and his talent for playing the accordion."

Several contemporaneous news articles describe his personal qualities and importance. An 1893 article in the Lewiston Daily Sun, written while he worked to establish St. Monica's for African American Catholics in Chicago, said, "Father Tolton ... is a fluent and graceful talker and has a singing voice of exceptional sweetness, which shows to good advantage in the chants of the high mass. It is no unusual thing for many white people to be seen among his congregation."  

Among Chicago’s Catholics, Tolton found a warm welcome from the Jesuits of Holy Family Church and St. Ignatius College (now St. Ignatius College Prep). They invited him to stay in the Jesuit residence in the 1869 school building and to preach at the High Mass at Holy Family on January 29, 1893. Holy Family was then the largest English-speaking parish in Chicago, composed primarily of Irish immigrants and their children who were also struggling to establish a home in the sometimes unwelcoming city. Tolton appealed “at all the masses” and collected $500 ($14,000 in 2020) for St. Monica Church, which was dedicated on January 14, 1894. The True Witness and Catholic Chronicle in 1894 described him as "indefatigable" in his efforts to establish the new parish.  

Daniel Rudd, who organized the initial Colored Catholic Congress in 1889, was quoted in the November 8, 1888, edition of The Irish Canadian as commenting about the Congress by saying:  "For a long time the idea prevailed that the negro was not wanted beyond the altar rail, and for that reason, no doubt, hundreds of young colored men who would otherwise be officiating at the altar rail today have entered other walks. Now that this mistaken idea has been dispelled by the advent of one full-blooded negro priest, the Rev. Augustus Tolton, many more have entered the seminaries in this country and Europe."  Tolton would go on to say Mass at the Congress itself, held in Washington, D.C. 

Another indication of the prominence given Tolton by parts of the American Catholic hierarchy was his participation, a few months later, on the altar at an international celebration of the centenary of the establishment of the first U.S. Catholic diocese in Baltimore. Writing about it in the New York Times edition of November 11, 1889, the correspondent noted that "As Cardinal Gibbons retired to his dais [on the altar at the Mass], the reporters in the improvised press gallery noticed for the first time, not six feet away from him in the sanctuary among the abbots and other special dignitaries, the Black face of Father Tolton of Chicago, the first African American Catholic priest ordained in America."

Death

Tolton began to be plagued by "spells of illness" in 1893. Because of them, he was forced to take a temporary leave of absence from his duties at St. Monica's Parish in 1895.

At the age of 43, on July 8, 1897, he collapsed and died the following day at Mercy Hospital as a result of the heat wave in Chicago in 1897. After a funeral which included 100 priests, Tolton was buried in the priests' lot in St. Peter's Cemetery in Quincy, which had been his expressed wish.

After Tolton's death, St. Monica's was made a mission of St. Elizabeth's Church. In 1924 it was closed as a national parish, as Black Catholics chose to attend parish churches in their neighborhoods.

Legacy and honors
 Tolton is the subject of the 1973 biography From Slave to Priest by Sister Caroline Hemesath. The book was reissued by Ignatius Press in 2006.
 In 1990, Sister Jamie T. Phelps, O.P., an Adrian Dominican Sister and then-faculty member of the Theology Department at Catholic Theological Union, initiated the Augustus Tolton Pastoral Ministry Program in consultation with Don Senior, President of CTU, the theology faculty, and representatives of the Archdiocese of Chicago, to prepare, educate, and form Black Catholic laity for ministerial leadership in the Archdiocese of Chicago.
 The Father Tolton Regional Catholic High School opened in Columbia, Missouri, in 2011.
 Augustus Tolton Catholic Academy opened in the fall of 2015 in Chicago, Illinois. Tolton Academy is the first STREAM school in the Archdiocese of Chicago. A focus on science, technology, religion, engineering, arts, and math sets it apart as a premier elementary school in Chicago. Tolton Academy is located at St. Columbanus Church.

Cause for beatification and canonization
On March 1, 2010, Cardinal Francis George of Chicago announced that he was beginning an official investigation into Tolton's life and virtues with a view to opening the cause for his canonization. This cause for sainthood is also being advanced by the Diocese of Springfield, Illinois, where Tolton first served as priest, as well as the Diocese of Jefferson City, Missouri, where his family was enslaved.

On February 24, 2011, the church officially began the formal introduction of the cause for Tolton's sainthood, and Tolton received the title Servant of God. Historical and theological commissions were established at this time to investigate his life, along with the Father Tolton Guild, which is responsible for the promotion of his cause through spiritual and financial endeavors. Cardinal George assigned Joseph Perry, Auxiliary Bishop of Chicago, to be the Diocesan Postulator for the cause of Tolton's canonization.

On September 29, 2014, Cardinal George formally closed the investigation into the life and virtues of Tolton. The dossier of research into Tolton's life went to the Vatican, where the documents collected to support his cause were analyzed, bound into a book called a "positio" or official position paper, evaluated by theologians, and then passed to the pope. The next stage would be to declare Tolton "Venerable" if it is found that he led a life of heroic virtue.

On December 10, 2016, Tolton's remains were exhumed and verified as part of the canonization process. Following procedures laid out in canon law, a forensic pathologist verified that the remains (which included a skull, femurs, ribs, vertebrae, pelvis, and portions of arm bones) belong to Tolton. Also found were the corpus from a crucifix, part of a Roman collar, the corpus from Tolton's rosary, and glass shards indicating his coffin had a glass top. After verification, the remains were dressed in a new chasuble and reburied.

On March 8, 2018, historians who consult the Congregation for the Causes of Saints unanimously issued their assent to Tolton's cause after receiving and favorably reviewing the positio presented to them. On February 5, 2019, the nine-member theological commission unanimously voted to approve the cause. It then went to the cardinal and bishop members of the Congregation for approval before being passed to the pope for his final confirmation.

On June 12, 2019, Pope Francis authorized the promulgation of a Decree of Heroic Virtue, advancing Tolton's cause. With the promulgation of the decree of heroic virtue, Tolton was granted the title Venerable. If the cause progresses, the next stage will be beatification, followed by canonization.

See also
 List of enslaved people

References

Further reading

External links
 Fr. Tolton's cause for canonization by the Archdiocese of Chicago
 Fr. Tolton's cause for canonization by the Diocese of Springfield (archived)

1854 births
1897 deaths
19th-century American Roman Catholic priests
19th-century American slaves
African-American Roman Catholicism
African-American Roman Catholic priests
Catholics from Illinois
Catholics from Missouri
History of slavery in Kentucky
History of slavery in Missouri
People from Quincy, Illinois
People from Ralls County, Missouri
Pontifical Urban University alumni
Quincy University alumni
Venerated_African-American_Catholics
Venerated Catholics by Pope Francis